Šentjanž ( or ; in older sources also Dvor) is a village in the Municipality of Sevnica in east-central Slovenia. Traditionally, it belongs to Lower Carniola. The municipality is now included in the Lower Sava Statistical Region.

Parish church
The local parish church from which the settlement gets its name is dedicated to John the Baptist (contracted to Šentjanž) and belongs to the Roman Catholic Diocese of Novo Mesto. It was first mentioned in written documents dating to 1444 but was totally rebuilt around 1900.

References

External links

Šentjanž at Geopedia

Populated places in the Municipality of Sevnica